"So Good" is a song recorded by Irish boyband Boyzone and released in July 1995 as the fourth single from the band's debut album, Said and Done (1995). The song became Boyzone's third consecutive  1 single in Ireland entered the UK Singles Chart at No. 3.

Critical reception
In his weekly UK chart commentary in Dotmusic, James Masterton stated that the song "finally moves them away from the pretty balladeering style of the last two singles and into a more uptempo pop groove." He added that "it is a competent enough single that sounds great on the radio in the sunshine". Pan-European magazine Music & Media wrote, "These Irish teenyboppers can definitely carry a good pop tune. The Deadly Mix has a slower, sexier rhythm, but don't expect any gangsta killa stuff." A reviewer from Music Week rated it four out of five, adding, "The Irish pretty boys turn in some more can't-fail pop, and this time it's got a more mature swing to it."

Music video
A music video was produced to promote the single, featuring the band performing inside what appears to be an abandoned factory. It was later published on Boyzone's official YouTube channel in December 2009. The video has amassed more than 1 million views as of September 2021.

Track listings
 UK CD1
 "So Good" (radio edit) – 3:03
 "Here to Eternity" – 3:33
 "So Good" (The 'Deadly' Mix) – 3:10

 UK CD2 (with limited-edition postcards)
 "So Good" (radio edit)
 "Here to Eternity"
 "So Good" (The 'Deadly' Mix)
 "And You"

 European CD single
 "So Good" (radio edit) – 3:03
 "Here to Eternity" – 3:33

Charts

Weekly charts

Year-end charts

References

1994 songs
1995 singles
Boyzone songs
Irish Singles Chart number-one singles
Number-one singles in Israel
Polydor Records singles
Songs written by Keith Duffy
Songs written by Martin Brannigan
Songs written by Michael Graham (singer)
Songs written by Ray Hedges
Songs written by Ronan Keating
Songs written by Shane Lynch
Songs written by Stephen Gately

it:Coming Home Now